Stogi  (German Heubuden) is a village in the administrative district of Gmina Malbork, within Malbork County, Pomeranian Voivodeship, in northern Poland. It is known for its historical Mennonite cemetery founded by Olędrzy, people of Dutch or German ancestry who settled Poland hundreds of years ago. 

Before 1772, the area was part of the Kingdom of Poland, from 1772 to 1919, Prussia and Germany, from 1920 to 1939, the Free City of Danzig, and, from September 1939 to February 1945, Nazi Germany. 

The village has a population of around 430 people.

Former Mennonite village of Heubuden
In Stogi there is the oldest (1768) and one of the biggest Mennonite cemeteries of Poland.

References

See also

For the history of the region, see History of Pomerania.

Stogi
Mennonitism in Poland
Vistula delta Mennonites